The women's singles tournament of the 2013 BWF World Championships (World Badminton Championships) was held from August 5 to 11. Wang Yihan was the defending champion. Ratchanok Inthanon defeated Li Xuerui 22–20, 18–21, 21–14 in the final.

Seeds

  Li Xuerui (final)
  Wang Yihan (third round)
  Saina Nehwal (quarterfinals)
  Ratchanok Intanon (champion)
  Sung Ji-hyun (third round)
  Tai Tzu-ying (quarterfinals)
  Wang Shixian (quarterfinals)
  Minatsu Mitani (second round)

  Lindaweni Fanetri (third round)
  P. V. Sindhu (semifinals)
  Eriko Hirose (third round)
  Sapsiree Taerattanachai (second round)
  Bae Yeon-ju (semifinals)
  Busanan Ongbumrungpan (second round)
  Porntip Buranaprasertsuk (third round)
  Yip Pui Yin (third round)

Draw

Finals

Section 1

Section 2

Section 3

Section 4

References
tournamentsoftware.com

2013 BWF World Championships
BWF